is a freelance Japanese voice actress.

Filmography

Anime

Movie

OVA/ONA

Video Game

Other Dubbing

Ashley Tisdale

Various Dubbed

Live-action

Animation

References

External links
Ryōko Nagata at Ryu's Seiyuu Infos

1975 births
Living people
Voice actresses from Gifu Prefecture
Japanese voice actresses
University of Tsukuba alumni